HLA-B56 (B56) is an HLA-B serotype. B56 is a split antigen from the B22 broad antigen, sister serotypes are B54 and B55. The serotype identifies the more common HLA-B*56 gene products. (For terminology help see: HLA-serotype tutorial)

Serotype

Allele distribution

References

5